Kiện Khê is a township of Thanh Liêm District, Hà Nam Province, Vietnam.

References

Populated places in Hà Nam province
Townships in Vietnam